Anton is a city in Hockley County, Texas, United States. The population was 1,126 at the 2010 census.

History

Anton was founded in 1924 near the center of the north pasture of the former Spade Ranch when ranch owner William Leonard Ellwood contracted with the Anton Townsite Company to plat a town at the site of Danforth Switch, a spur of the Pecos and Northern Texas Railway. The town was named in honor of J.F. Anton, a Santa Fe railroad executive.

Anton's first mayor was Paul Grover Whitfield, who was born in July 1908, so in 1924 was only 16 or 17 years old. He told everyone he was 18, so was able to accept the position. He is, therefore, on record as being the youngest mayor ever in Texas at the time, and since he was under 18, the record stands to this day and likely will for all time. Whether an election was held or if he simply volunteered for the position is unclear. In those days, identification was not required because most agreements were done with a handshake.

Geography
Anton sits just to the east of the geographic center of the level High Plains of the Llano Estacado.

Anton is well situated with regard to transportation. It is located at the intersection of U.S. Route 84 and Farm to Market Roads 168 and 597. US 84 leads southeast  to Lubbock and northwest  to Littlefield. The Burlington Northern Santa Fe Railway passes through the western edge of town.

Demographics

2020 census

As of the 2020 United States census, there were 907 people, 434 households, and 272 families residing in the city.

2000 census
As of the census of 2000, there were 1,200 people, 423 households, and 313 families residing in the city. The population density was 1,512.4 people per square mile (586.5/km2). There were 465 housing units at an average density of 586.1 per square mile (227.3/km2). The racial makeup of the city was 71.92% White, 5.33% African American, 21.17% from other races, and 1.58% from two or more races. Hispanic or Latino of any race were 45.83% of the population.

There were 423 households, out of which 39.7% had children under the age of 18 living with them, 61.5% were married couples living together, 9.0% had a female householder with no husband present, and 25.8% were non-families. 23.9% of all households were made up of individuals, and 14.7% had someone living alone who was 65 years of age or older. The average household size was 2.84 and the average family size was 3.40.

In the city, the population was spread out, with 32.8% under the age of 18, 7.8% from 18 to 24, 25.9% from 25 to 44, 18.8% from 45 to 64, and 14.8% who were 65 years of age or older. The median age was 34 years. For every 100 females, there were 95.4 males. For every 100 females age 18 and over, there were 89.9 males.

The median income for a household in the city was $30,924, and the median income for a family was $36,250. Males had a median income of $26,188 versus $18,036 for females. The per capita income for the city was $13,001. About 15.0% of families and 21.6% of the population were below the poverty line, including 23.8% of those under age 18 and 21.5% of those age 65 or over.

Education
Anton is served by the Anton Independent School District and is home to the Anton High School Bulldogs.

References

External links

Cities in Texas
Cities in Hockley County, Texas